Céline Huyghebaert is a French-born Canadian writer and artist, who won the Governor General's Award for French-language fiction for her novel Le drap blanc at the 2019 Governor General's Awards.

Originally from the French department of Yvelines, she has resided in Montreal, Quebec since 2002. She recently completed a doctorate in arts at the Université du Québec à Montréal, where she was awarded the Bronfman Fellowship in Contemporary Art in April 2019.

Remnants, an English translation of Le drap blanc by Aleshia Jensen, is slated for publication in 2022.

References

21st-century Canadian artists
21st-century Canadian novelists
21st-century Canadian women writers
21st-century French artists
21st-century French novelists
21st-century French women writers
Canadian multimedia artists
Canadian women artists
Canadian women novelists
Canadian novelists in French
French multimedia artists
French women artists
French women novelists
French emigrants to Canada
Governor General's Award-winning fiction writers
People from Yvelines
Université du Québec à Montréal alumni
Living people
Year of birth missing (living people)
20th-century French women
Université Laval alumni